La Misión may refer to:

Places in Mexico
La Misión, Baja California
La Misión, Hidalgo

See also
 Misión (disambiguation)
 La Mission (disambiguation)